The Lancashire County Board of the Gaelic Athletic Association (GAA), or Lancashire GAA, is one of the county boards outside Ireland and is responsible for the running of Gaelic games in the North West of England and on the Isle of Man. With Scotland, Warwickshire, Gloucestershire, Hertfordshire, London and Yorkshire, the board makes up the British Provincial Board. The Lancashire board oversees the Lancashire Junior Championship, the Lancashire Junior League, and the first and second division of the Pennine League.

The executive committee consists of a chair, secretary and treasurer, and the county has two representatives on the British Provincial Council Executive Committee.

The county crest depicts the Celtic cross and shamrock, the red rose of Lancashire and a ship representing the voyage taken by all of those who have left Ireland to make Lancashire their home or the place they are passing through. The crest was designed by former county secretary Seán Hackett in 2007.

Clubs

In recent years the county has lost two clubs: St. Ann's, Manchester and St.Patricks, Chester. Ellan Vannin Gaels in the Isle of Mann have begun underage after stopping playing adult football in three years. There are eight affiliated clubs, the majority of which are based in Manchester and Liverpool. As of 2019, the clubs participating were:

Gaelic football

Clubs 

Clubs contest the Lancashire Senior Football Championship.

County team 

Football is the dominant sport in Lancashire GAA. The county featured in four successive All-Britain Junior Football Championships, losing the 2009 final but winning in 2010, 2011 (Lancashire 1-11, Warwickshire 0-04) and 2012 (Lancashire 2-10, London 0-10). In 2010 and 2011 Lancashire reached the semi-finals of the All-Ireland Junior Football Championship, losing to Kerry GAA in 2010 and to Kildare in 2011.

Honours
 All-Ireland Junior Football Championship
 Runners-Up (4): 1949, 1953, 1958, 1963
 All-Britain Junior Football Championship
 Winners (5): 2010, 2011, 2012, 2013, 2016
 Runners-Up (2): 2007, 2009

Senior Club Championship Roll of Honour
1951 Oisins
1952 John Mitchels
1953 Oisins
1954 - 
1955 Shannon Rangers
1956 - 
1957 Oisins
1958 St Wilfreds
1959 Oisins
1960 Shannon Rangers
1961 Harp & Shamrocks
1962 Harp & Shamrocks
1963 -
1964 St Brendans
1965 John Mitchels
1966 John Mitchels
1967 St Brendans
1968 St Brendans
1969 Oisins
1970 St Brendans
1971 St Brendans
1972 St Brendans
1973 De La Salle
1974 De La Salle
1975 St Brendans
1976 Oisins
1977 Oisins
1978 St Brendans
1979 St Brendans
1980 St Brendans
1981 Oisins
1982 Oisins
1983 St Brendans
1984 St Brendans
1985 St Brendans
1986 St Brendans
1987 St Peters
1988 St Brendans
1989 St Brendans
1990 St Brendans
1991 St Brendans
1992 St Peters
1993 St Peters
1994 Oisins
1995 St Peters
1996 St Brendans
1997 St Peters
1998 St Lawerences
1999 John Mitchels
2000 St Peters
2001 St Peters
2002 Oisins
2003 St Lawerences
2004 St Peters
2005 St Peters
2006 Oisins
2007 John Mitchels
2008 John Mitchels
2009 John Mitchels
2010 St Peters
2011 John Mitchels
2012 St Peters
2013 John Mitchels
2014 John Mitchels
2015 John Mitchels
2016 John Mitchels
2017 Oisins
2018 Oisins
2019 Oisins
2020 Oisins
2021 St Brendans
2022 St Brendans

Total

St.Brendans:21, Oisins:16, John Mitchels:12, St.Peters:11, St.Lawrences:2, Shannon Rangers:2, Harp & Shamrock:2, De La Salle:2, St.Wilfrids:1

Honours
All Britain Junior Football Championship (3)
2010, 2011, 2012, 2013, 2016; runners-up 2009

GAA History in Liverpool
The first match recorded in Liverpool was in 1901, where Liverpool Young Ireland's defeated Manchester Martyrs. According to Tommy Walsh there were 300 in attendance including the Special Branch, who were no doubt keeping a watchful eye. By 1906, both hurling and camogie were played in Liverpool and were played in the Aintree area, where the famous racecourse is located now. Later, the Young Irelands changed their name to Eire Og and then to St.Patricks by 1940.

Today, if you had the finest of Liverpool up against the finest of Kilkenny on a hurling field; there would be only one outcome. In 1912 however, the two teams met in the All-Ireland Senior Hurling Championship Semi-Final. The Cats won by 4-03 to 1-03, the game was played in Liverpool however unfortunately the exact location was not recorded and no one in the county board was about in that time to clarify things!

By 1924 a new GAA ground was used at Dingle Brook Farm in West Derby. Two years later, the Provincial Council was formed and the only two affiliated boards were London and Liverpool GAA. The two boards fielded teams annually, in both hurling and football, to play each other for the P.J. O'Connor and Sam Maguire cups respectively. The hurling matches were normally won by Liverpool, while the football games were typically won by the London team.

By 1926, the Liverpool County Board (formed before the Lancashire County Board), secured a pitch at Thingwall Road in Broadgreen. They were warned that if there were any fighting during games then they would lose the pitch! The following year the teams who were playing around Liverpool were as follows:
 Granuaile (Southport)
 Eire Og (today's John Mitchels)
 Exiles
 Gaels
 Thomas Ashes
 Earlestown
 Terence McSwineys
 Kathleen ni Houlihans (camogie, they represented the Gaelic League and St. Brigid's, Manchester)

By 1927, the Secretary's report stated that there were five hurling, two football and two camogie clubs affiliated. Eleven years later, the teams in Lancashire were:
 Eire Og (hurling and football)
 Sean O'Donovans (hurling and football)
 Patrick Pearses (football)
 Kevin Barry's (football)

During World War 2, the GAA in Lancashire had its ups and downs, one of the pluses was a new club being formed in Wigan.

Between 1948 and 1950, John Mitchels GAC was formed, however according to Tommy Walsh, they didn't succeed in attracting the young Irish men into their ranks. They dissolved into the St.Patrick's Club, St.Patrick's hurling and John Mitchel's Gaelic football. Peter Delaney was one of the founders of the John Mitchels club and he became secretary of the larger club. By 1953, games were played at Yew Tree Field, Preston were playing Gaelic games and Lancashire got to the All-Ireland Junior Final, losing to Cork. Two years later, Gaelic games were being played at Thingwall Hall (St.Edward's Orphanage) and after that at Sefton Rugby Club, West Derby.

There were many great players to grace the John Mitchels team over the years, however none more so than the great James McCartan snr and his brother Dan, as well as a smattering of Derry county players. The reason for this was during the Gaelic exhibition games at Wembley, John Mitchels took part in the festivities against London Shamrocks as a feeder for the bigger inter-county games. Of course making the long trip south resulted in not bring a full 15, so the aforementioned players togged out for the Liverpool team.

By the 1970s and 80s the economic situation was improving in Ireland, therefore the influx of Irish playing Gaelic games in Britain was declining. By 1978 there were 40 underage games played at Newsham Park. A very strong group of families were active. The 1980s saw hurling die in Liverpool as well as the underage. On the plus side however, 1982 saw comprehensive fixtures being first produced, thanks to Peter Gallagher.

John Mitchels adult team soon began to find it hard to field but thanks to Barry Morris, who also played with the club, reformed the club and affiliated it to the Lancashire County Board. The club of course, reached Croke Park to play in the All-Ireland Junior Final in 2009.

Hurling

Clubs 

Clubs contest the Lancashire Senior Hurling Championship.

County team 

Lancashire competed in the Lory Meagher Cup (Tier 5 of the All-Ireland Senior Hurling Championship) for the first time in 2015.

2018 was their inaugural appearance in the national hurling league. They won the Allianz Hurling League Division 3B title at the first attempt.

National Hurling League Division 3B (1): 2018

The Lancashire Senior Hurling League (All Britain Hurling Shield Group A Northern Section) is currently contested by four teams: Wolf Tones, Fullen Gaels, Yorkshire Emeralds (Leeds), and Ceann Creige (Glasgow).

Facilities

There are seven pitches in Lancashire:
Wavertree Park, Liverpool - Liverpool Wolfe Tones
Chester University - St Patrick's
Smithdown Road, Liverpool - John Mitchel's
Hough End - St Brendan's, St Peter's, Fullen Gaels
Old Bedian's - Oisín's
Turn Moss - St Ann's, St Lawrence's

Two clubs from outside Lancashire play in Lancashire competitions also:
Chester Naomh Padraig GFC, Blacon Avenue, Chester, Cheshire
Ellen Vannin Gaels, GAA Grounds, Douglas, Isle of Man

Notable players
Tom Scully was a Gaelic football manager, priest and schoolteacher.

References

External links
 

British GAA
Gaelic games governing bodies in the United Kingdom
Sport in Lancashire
1920s establishments in the United Kingdom
Sport in the Isle of Man